Chino or El Chino may refer to:

Art, entertainment, and media
 Chino (1973 film), an Italian film starring Charles Bronson
 Chino (1991 film), a Nepali film

Places
 Chino, California, a city in San Bernardino County, California, USA
 Chino, Nagano, a city in Nagano prefecture, Japan
 Chino Hills, a mountain range on the border of Orange, Los Angeles, and San Bernardino counties, California
 Chino Hills, California, a city in San Bernardino County, California, USA
 Chino Valley, Arizona, a town in Yavapai County, Arizona, USA

People

People nicknamed "Chino" 
 Chino Cadahia (born 1957), Cuban baseball coach
 Chino Herrera (1903–1983), Mexican actor and comedian
 Chino Moreno (born 1973), American musician
 Chino Pozo (1915–1980), Cuban drummer
 David Rheem, US poker player
 Chino Roque (born 1990), was a space cadets
 Javi Chino (born 1987), Spanish footballer 
 Chino Smith (1903–1932), Negro league baseball player
 Jesús Alberto Miranda Pérez, one half of the Venezuelan pop due Chino & Nacho

People nicknamed "El Chino" 
 Alberto Fujimori (born 1938), Peruvian president
 Jorge José Benítez (born 1950), Argentine footballer
 Daniel Canónico, (1916–1975), Venezuelan baseball player
 Roberto Losada (born 1976), Spanish footballer
 Marcos Maidana, Argentine boxer
 Álvaro Recoba (born 1976), Uruguayan footballer
 Marcelo Ríos (born 1975), Chilean tennis player
 David Silva (born 1986), Spanish footballer
 Melissa Calderon née Melissa Margarita Calderon Ojeda, Mexican cartel leader nicknamed "La China"
 "El Chino", photographer whose photos are used in the Netflix TV series Narcos

People with this name 
 Chino Darín (born 1989), Argentine actor and film producer
 Chino 'Fats' Williams (1933–2000)), American actor
 Chino Rodriguez (born 1954), American musician

People with this surname 
, Japanese civil servant
 Wendell Chino (1923–1998), leader of the Mescalero Apache nation
, Japanese former football player
 Vera Chino (1943), Native American potter
 Tom Chino, Californian farmer

Other uses
 Chino (Is the Order a Rabbit?), a character in the manga series Is the Order a Rabbit?
 Chinotto (soft drink) or Chino, a carbonated soft drink
 Chino cloth, a twill fabric
 California Institution for Men, a prison in Chino, San Bernardino County, California nicknamed "Chino"

See also 
 Cino (disambiguation)

Japanese-language surnames